WVYC is a college radio station licensed by the Federal Communications Commission (FCC) to serve the community of York, Pennsylvania, United States.  The station broadcasts from the Robert V. Iosue Student Union Building on the campus of York College of Pennsylvania in York.

History
The station began broadcasting on 88.1 MHz on November 18, 1976, with the inauguration of College President, Robert V. Iosue.  The broadcast day was from 4pm to midnight.  By the mid 80s through the early 2000s, the station aired from 8am to 1am but was off the air over summer and winter breaks.  The broadcast day eventually expanded with the station now on the air 24/7/365.

The York College station is the only class D non-commercial, educational FM radio station in southern Pennsylvania.  It broadcasts a free-form alternative music block format, including modern Hip hop, Indie rock, Alternative rock, Latin Music, Electronic Music, Classic rock, and Heavy Metal.

Operation
WVYC is a member the Associated Press.  The station produces and broadcasts a variety of educational, instructional and public affairs programs.  WVYC is a member of the Pennsylvania Association of Broadcasters.

The station is licensed to the college Board of Trustees and operates as a division of the Department of Communication and the Arts

Staff and events
WVYC has also recently been hosting free, all ages live music events on the college campus to bring exposure and promotion to York-Harrisburg-Lancaster-Carlisle musical acts.

External links
 WVYC official website
 

VYC
VYC
York College of Pennsylvania